Pleasant Farms is an unincorporated community in southeastern Ector County, Texas, United States. It is part of the Odessa Metropolitan Statistical Area.

External links

Unincorporated communities in Texas
Unincorporated communities in Ector County, Texas